Juan Ernesto Mancín Salami (born 31 January 2000) is a Venezuelan footballer who plays as a right winger.

Club career

Metropolitanos
Mancín is a product of Metropolitanos. He got his official debut for Metropolitanos on 18 February 2018 in a Venezuelan Primera División game against Deportivo La Guaira. He ended his first season as a professional, with a total of 10 appearances in all tournaments.

Mancín scored his first professional goal on 24 August 2019 in a 3–0 victory against Zulia FC in the Venezuelan Primera División. He ended the 2019 season with six goals in 25 games.

In August 2020, Mancín signed a one-year contract extension until the end of 2021. After a 2021 season, where he scored five goals in 23 games, Metropolitanos announced on 10 January 2022 that Mancín wouldn't extend his contract and had left the club.

References

External links
 

Living people
2000 births
Association football wingers
Venezuelan footballers
Venezuelan Primera División players
Metropolitanos FC players
Footballers from Caracas